Lauren Ellis (born 19 April 1989) is a New Zealand former road and track cyclist.

Career
Ellis rode the team pursuit at the 2008–09 UCI Track Cycling World Cup Classics in Beijing with Kaytee Boyd and Alison Shanks, in a time of 3:28.044, becoming the fastest qualifiers. They went on to take the gold medal in a time of 3:24.421, setting the second fastest time in the world behind the 3:22.425 world record set by Great Britain at Manchester in 2008.

In 2009, she won a silver medal in the Team Pursuit World Championships with Jaime Nielsen and
Alison Shanks.

Ellis won a silver medal in the women's points race at the 2010 Commonwealth Games and the 2010 World Championships.
 
At the 2012 Summer Olympics, she rode the Women's team pursuit. The New Zealand team placed 5th and set the current national record of 3:18.514.

At the 2016 Summer Olympics, she rode the Women's team pursuit and Omnium. The New Zealand team placed 4th and set the current national record of 4:17.592 during the first round.  Ellis also placed 4th in the Omnium.

Major results

2006
 1st  Individual pursuit, National Junior Track Championships
 2nd  Individual pursuit, UCI Junior Track Cycling World Championships
2007
 1st  Individual pursuit, National Junior Track Championships
 3rd  Individual pursuit, UCI Junior Track Cycling World Championships
2008
 1st  Points race, National Track Championships
 2nd  Team pursuit, Oceania Track Championships
2009
 Oceania Track Championships
1st  Team pursuit
2nd  Individual pursuit
2nd  Scratch
 1st  Team pursuit, 2009–10 UCI Track Cycling World Cup Classics, Melbourne
 2nd  Team pursuit, UCI Track Cycling World Championships
2010
 UCI Track Cycling World Championships
2nd  Points race
3rd  Team pursuit
 2nd  Points race, Commonwealth Games
 2nd  Team pursuit, Oceania Track Championships
 3rd  Team pursuit, 2010–11 UCI Track Cycling World Cup Classics, Melbourne
2011
 Oceania Track Championships
1st  Team pursuit
2nd  Points race
3rd  Individual pursuit
 2nd  Team pursuit, 2010–11 UCI Track Cycling World Cup Classics, Manchester
 8th Individual pursuit, UCI Track Cycling World Championships
2012
 1st  Time trial, National Road Championships
2013
 Oceania Track Championships
1st  Individual pursuit
1st  Team pursuit
3rd  Omnium
3rd  Points race
 1st  Points race, National Track Championships
 1st Omnium, Invercargill
2014
 Oceania Track Championships
1st  Points race
1st  Team pursuit (with Jaime Nielsen, Racquel Sheath and Georgia Williams)
 1st  Scratch, National Track Championships
 BikeNZ Classic
2nd Scratch
3rd Omnium
 2nd Points race, BikeNZ Cup
2015
 1st  Omnium, National Track Championships
 1st Stage 2 Tour of America's Dairyland
 3rd Time trial, National Road Championships
 3rd Omnium, Super Drome Cup
2016
 Festival of Speed
1st Points race
1st Scratch
2019
 1st  Madison, National Track Championships
 3rd  Individual pursuit, Oceania Track Championships

References

External links

1989 births
New Zealand female cyclists
Olympic cyclists of New Zealand
Cyclists at the 2012 Summer Olympics
Cyclists at the 2016 Summer Olympics
Commonwealth Games silver medallists for New Zealand
Cyclists at the 2010 Commonwealth Games
Living people
Sportspeople from Ashburton, New Zealand
Cyclists at the 2014 Commonwealth Games
Commonwealth Games medallists in cycling
Medallists at the 2010 Commonwealth Games